So Fresh: The Hits of Winter 2004 is a compilation of songs that were popular in Australia in winter 2004. It was released on 21 June 2004. Despite including 'I Don't Want You Back' this album doesn't have a warning label for explicit language, though the version of the song on this release is the clean edited version.

Track listing
 Anastacia – "Left Outside Alone" (4:16)
 Shannon Noll – "Drive" (3:58)
 Jessica Simpson – "With You" (3:11)
 Baby Bash featuring Frankie J – "Suga Suga" (3:59)
 Beyoncé – "Naughty Girl" (3:28)
 Outkast – "The Way You Move" (3:54)
 Human Nature – "When You Say You Love Me" (4:01)
 Maroon 5 – "This Love" (3:26)
 Pete Murray – "So Beautiful" (4:38)
 Avril Lavigne – "Don't Tell Me" (3:25)
 The Black Eyed Peas – "Hey Mama" (3:46)
 Britney Spears – "Toxic" (3:19)
 Sarah Connor – "Bounce" (3:14)
 Enrique Iglesias featuring Kelis – "Not in Love" (3:42)
 Guy Sebastian – "All I Need Is You" (4:04)
 Eamon – "Fuck It (I Don't Want You Back)" (3:45)
 Three Days Grace – "I Hate Everything About You" (3:52)
 Courtney Act – "Rub Me Wrong" (3:49)
 Popstars Live: The Finalists – "Stand Up Next to Me" (4:11)
 Nickelback – "Feelin' Way Too Damn Good" (3:53)

Charts

See also
So Fresh

References

External links
 Official site

So Fresh albums
2004 compilation albums
2004 in Australian music